Garitas or retenes (singular: retén) are federal inspection stations operated by the Mexican government.
They are officially known as "garitas de revisión" (checkpoints). They are usually located within  of the national border with the United States, Belize, and Guatemala. They function as immigration checkpoints, where documents and cargo are to be inspected.

The United States Border Patrol operates a similar series of checkpoints. These are also referred to as garitas by the Latin American community.

List of garitas in Mexico 

Garitas along the Mexico–U.S. Border (listed in order from west to east)
 Garita Santa Rosalía – located along Federal Highway 1 in Baja California Sur 
	Garita El Vado – located just south of the official Ciudad Gustavo Díaz Ordaz international crossing, Gustavo Díaz Ordaz, Tamaulipas

Garitas along the Mexico–Guatemala Border (listed in order from south to north)
	Garita El Carmen Xhan – located in Carmen Xhan, Chiapas 	
	Garita Tzimol – located near Comitán de Domínguez, Chiapas 

Garitas in the Yucatán Peninsula

References

External links
 Aduana Mexico. 2007. Aduanas 25 de las Reglas de Caracter General en Materia de Comercio Exterior para 2007.

Border crossings of Mexico
Road transportation in Mexico
Immigration to Mexico